Miekojärvi is medium-sized lake in the Tornionjoki main catchment area in Finland. It is located in Pello and Ylitornio municipalities, in the western Lapland region. Miekojärvi flows through Tengeliönjoki to Torne (river).

See also
List of lakes in Finland

References

Lakes of Pello
Lakes of Ylitornio